Cite was an Italian professional cycling team that existed from 1963 to 1964.

The team was selected to race in two editions of the Giro d'Italia, where they achieved two stage wins.

Major wins
1963
 Stage 3 Giro d'Italia, Jaime Alomar
 Coppa Agostoni, Jaime Alomar
1964
 Stage 9 Giro d'Italia, Pietro Zoppas
 Trofeo Masferrer, Jaime Alomar

References

Defunct cycling teams based in Italy
1966 establishments in Italy
1967 disestablishments in Italy
Cycling teams established in 1963
Cycling teams disestablished in 1964